Pish Posh is the name of a children's novel by American author Ellen Potter, first published in 2006. It tells the story of a young girl, Clara Frankofile, who is a pompous, snobbish 11-year-old who spends her evenings people-watching from a corner table in her parents' chic New York City restaurant, Pish Posh.

Summary
Ultra snobby, Clara Frankofile has everything an 11-year-old could want. She's fabulously wealthy, she lives alone in a penthouse apartment with its own roller coaster and bumper cars... and all of New York City is afraid of her! Each night at the fashionable Pish Posh restaurant, she watches glittery movie actresses, princesses, and celebrities and decides who is important enough to stay...and who she will kick to the sidewalk in disgrace.

But Clara's tidy little world is suddenly turned upside down when she discovers that a most peculiar mystery  is happening in the restaurant, right under her upturned nose. With the help of a whip-smart 12-year-old jewel thief, Clara embarks on a wildly dangerous mission through the streets of New York to solve a 200-year-old secret.

References

American children's novels
2006 American novels
Novels set in New York City
Children's mystery novels
2006 children's books